Paul Ashley Warren Atkinson (19 March 1946 – 1 April 2004) was a British guitarist and record company executive. He was best known as a founding member of the pop/rock band The Zombies. Atkinson was posthumously inducted into the Rock and Roll Hall of Fame in 2019.

Life

Early Life and Education 
Paul Atkinson was born in Cuffley, Hertfordshire on 19 March 1946, son of Stanley Atkinson, a stockbroker's accountant who worked in the City of London, and Clyde, a teacher of English, languages, and secretarial skills courses at a technical college. When he was nine, the family moved to St Albans. He was educated at St Albans School, and contemplated going into the Diplomatic Service like several members of his family, or studying anthropology. Having passed the requisite A-levels, he enrolled at Newcastle University, but having met with musical success did not continue his studies.

The Zombies 
At St Albans, Atkinson met Rod Argent and Hugh Grundy, and the three formed a band initially called the Mustangs, later changed to The Zombies. Colin Blunstone and Paul Arnold joined the new band in mid 1958, but Arnold soon left and was replaced by Chris White. After the group won a local contest, they recorded a demo as their prize. Argent's song "She's Not There" got them a deal with Decca Records and was a hit in the UK and US. 

An album, Begin Here (renamed to The Zombies when released in the US) would follow. They would appear on American television for the first time on January 12 1965, when they appeared on the first episode of Hullabaloo.

The Zombies would have another chart-topper in 1964 with Tell Her No. The group continued to record successfully through the 1960s, but disbanded in December 1967, reportedly over management disagreements. A second album was released in 1968 titled Odessey and Oracle, which featured the song Time of the Season. Time of the Season is one of the Zombies most successful singles, along with She’s Not There.

Later Works 
Atkinson later became an artists and repertoire executive at Dick James Music, the Beatles' publishing company, which developed into a production company, discovering and signing such bands as Elton John, ABBA, Bruce Hornsby, Mr. Mister,  Michael Penn and Grayson Hugh, who Atkinson brought to MCA Records from RCA Records in 1991. 

In January 2004 Atkinson received the President's Merit Award from the National Academy of Recording Arts and Sciences at a benefit concert at the House of Blues in Los Angeles. The Zombies reunited for the event.

Death 
Atkinson died at the age of 58 in a Santa Monica hospital due to liver and kidney disease on 1 April 2004. He had been suffering from cancer for some time, and had two liver transplants.

Atkinson was posthumously inducted into the Rock and Roll Hall of Fame in 2019.

Discography

The Zombies

Studio albums
Begin Here (UK) / The Zombies (US) (1965)
Odessey and Oracle (1968)

EPs
The Zombies (1964)

Singles

References

20th-century British guitarists
English rock guitarists
English record producers
1946 births
2004 deaths
Deaths from kidney failure
Deaths from hepatitis
People from Cuffley
The Zombies members
Musicians from Hertfordshire
Lead guitarists
People educated at St Albans School, Hertfordshire